Fatoumata Dembélé Diarra (born 15 February 1949 in Koulikoro) is a Malian lawyer and judge. She has been a judge for the International Criminal Tribunal for the former Yugoslavia (ICTY) and has been a judge of the International Criminal Court since 2003.

She is also a graduate of the École Nationale de la Magistrature in Paris.

In Mali, she has been an examining magistrate, the president of the country's Assize Court, the president of the Criminal Chamber of the Bamako Appeals Court, and the national director of the Justice Department of Mali.

Prior to being elected a judge of the ICC, Dembélé Diarra was a judge for the ICTY. In 2003, she was elected as one of the first judges of the ICC. Diarra's term expires in 2012. In 2009, Dembélé Diarra was serving as the First Vice-President of the ICC under the president Sang-Hyun Song. She is a member of the ICC's Trial Division.

Fatoumata Dembélé Diarra was at the heart of the Malian Democratic Movement that opposed the monolithic and dictatorial system of General Moussa Traoré in 1991. At the time of the Sovereign National Lecture of Mali in 1991, Madame Fatoumata Dembélé Diarra was an expert member of the group of people who contributed to the compilation of fundamental texts of a democratic Mali. She was elected Judge of the International Criminal Court in 2003.

She is the founding president of the Office on Relief for Impoverished Women and Children and Observation of the Rights of Children and Women (ODEF). Through these two structures, she has supported hundreds of women and of children in distress. She is at ease in her work since she is a magistrate and knows all the intricacies of Malian justice. Her legal office has given many women free legal assistance to defend their rights. Madame Diarra was Vice President of the International Federation of Women in Legal Careers (FIFCJ) from 1994 to 1997. She has also been vice president of the Federation of African Lawyers since March 1995 and has attended several courses on the legal position of women and children in Mali and in Africa. She has published many articles, for example Rights and Exclusion, Legal Assistance, Circumcision and Positive Malian Rights, and Violence against Women and the Obstacles to the Malian Women Exercising their Rights. Madame Dembélé Diarra was a member of the national commission on trafficking in children and international adoption, a commission that has done much to protect Malian children against the networks of organized crimes that, ultimately, sell them to the coffee and cocoa plantations in Ivory Coast.

She is a member of the Crimes Against Humanity Initiative Advisory Council, a project of the Whitney R. Harris World Law Institute at Washington University School of Law in St. Louis to establish the world’s first treaty on the prevention and punishment of crimes against humanity.

References

External links
ICC: Judge Fatoumata Dembele DIARRA (Mali), First Vice-President

1949 births
Living people
Malian judges
Malian lawyers
International Criminal Court judges
International Criminal Tribunal for the former Yugoslavia judges
Women judges
Cheikh Anta Diop University alumni
People from Koulikoro Region
Malian judges of United Nations courts and tribunals
Malian judges of international courts and tribunals
21st-century Malian people